"100 Años" is a song written and recorded by American musical duo Ha*Ash and American singer Prince Royce. It was released on October 13, 2017 as the first of the single from their fifth studio album 30 de Febrero (2017). The song then included on their live album Ha*Ash: En Vivo (2019). It was written by Ashley Grace, Hanna Nicole, Geoffrey Rojas, Erika Ender and Andy Clay.

Background and release 
"100 Años" was written by Ashley Grace, Hanna Nicole, Geoffrey Rojas, Erika Ender and Andy Clay and produced by Hanna Nicole and Matt Rad. The band started working on the song during the 1F Hecho Realidad Tour. It was confirmed the single to be the first single from the album in September 2017 in Mexico. The song went to Latin radio stations in early October.

Music video 
A music video for "100 Años" was released on October 20, 2017. It was directed by Pablo Croce. The video was filmed in Hollywood Beach. , the video has over 120 million views on YouTube.

The second video for "100 Años", recorded live for the live album Ha*Ash: En Vivo, was released on December 6, 2019. The video was filmed in Auditorio Nacional, Mexico City.

Commercial performance 
The track peaked at number 50 in the Latin Pop Songs and at number 24 in the Latin Airplay charts in the United States. In Mexico, the song peaked at number one on the Mexican Singles Chart, and Monitor Latino. On February 14, 2018 the song was certified gold in México. On May 23, 2018 the song was certified Platinum in México. On June 23, 2018, it was announced that "100 Años" had been certified Doble Platinum in Perú. On November 11, 2018 "100 Años" was certified platinum+gold in México. In July 2019, the songs was certified as double platinum in Mexico.

Live performances 
Ha*Ash performed "100 años" for the first time at "The Voice Spain" in December 2017. On February 24, 2018, the duo appeared on Festival Viña del Mar, and also performed "100 Años". Also in August 2018, the duo appeared on the Mexican Kid Choice Awards and performed the single.

Credits and personnel 
Credits adapted from Genius.

Recording and management

 Recording Country: United States
 Sony / ATV Discos Music Publishing LLC / Westwood Publishing
 (P) 2017 Sony Music Entertainment México, S.A. De C.V.

Ha*Ash
 Ashley Grace  – vocals, guitar, songwriting
 Hanna Nicole  – vocals, guitar, piano, songwriting, production
Additional personnel
 Erika Ender  – songwriting
 Andy Clay  – songwriting, editor
 Prince Royce  – vocals, songwriting
 Matt Rad  – engineer, director, editor, keyboards, guitar
 George Noriega  – editor
 Francesco Grieco  – assistant engineer

Charts

Weekly charts

Year-end charts

Certifications 

|-
! scope="row" |Perú (UNIMPRO)
|2× Platinum
|20,000^
|-

Release history

References 

Ha*Ash songs
Songs written by Ashley Grace
Songs written by Hanna Nicole
Songs written by Prince Royce
Song recordings produced by Matt Rad
Prince Royce songs
2017 songs
2017 singles
Spanish-language songs
Sony Music Latin singles
Monitor Latino Top General number-one singles